Marti Pellow Sings the Hits of Wet Wet Wet & Smile is a compilation/cover album by Wet Wet Wet frontman Marti Pellow. The album contains re-recordings of Wet Wet Wet hits. It was released on 18 November 2002.

Three of the eighteen songs were taken directly from his debut album, 2001's Smile. These were the only tracks not to be re-recorded.

Track listing
"Love Is All Around" (Reg Presley)
"Wishing I Was Lucky" (Wet Wet Wet)
"Angel Eyes (Home and Away)" (Wet Wet Wet)
"Sweet Little Mystery" (Wet Wet Wet)
"Julia Says" (Wet Wet Wet)
"Sweet Surrender" (Wet Wet Wet)
"With a Little Help from My Friends" (The Beatles)
"Goodnight Girl" (Wet Wet Wet)
"If I Never See You Again" (Wet Wet Wet)
"Strange" (Wet Wet Wet)
"Close to You" (from Smile)
"Temptation" (Wet Wet Wet)
"Yesterday/Maybe I'm in Love" (The Beatles/Wet Wet Wet)
"She's All on My Mind" (Wet Wet Wet)
"Hard to Cry" (from Smile)
"Don't Want to Forgive Me Now" (Wet Wet Wet)
"I've Been Around the World" (from Smile)
"Somewhere Somehow" (Wet Wet Wet)

References

2002 albums
Marti Pellow albums
Covers albums